McAllen Memorial High School is one of five high schools serving the McAllen, Texas area as a part of the McAllen Independent School District. It houses over 2,000 students from grades 9-12. Prior to the establishment of Memorial High School, the school and its building were originally opened and operated as Brown Middle School. The high school opened in 1980, at its current location, 101 East Hackberry Avenue McAllen, Texas, United States. The school colors are Columbia blue and bright gold and the mascot is a mustang. All athletic teams compete in the UIL District 30-6A.

Demographics 
As of 2017, McAllen Memorial's student body was 94% Hispanic, 5% White, and 1% Asian.

History
Memorial High School began in 1980, renovations were made to the Health Clinic, Assistant Principal offices, Attendance office, Auditorium in 1999.

Campus
The high school lies on 39.39 acres of land, there are currently 100 permanent classrooms and 3 portable classrooms. Along with the classrooms, Memorial has a football stadium, gym, and weight room.

Athletics
McAllen Memorial High School possesses one of the best regular season football records for the Rio Grande Valley with a 12–1 record in 2012 that included a 12-game win streak before a loss in the playoffs.

Feeder patterns
McAllen Memorial High's feeder schools include:
Bonham, Escandon, Gonzales, Houston, Jackson, Milam (partial), and Roosevelt elementary schools
Dr. Rodney D. Cathey Middle School, Homer J. Morris Middle School (formerly), and Dorothea Brown Middle School

References

External links 
 McAllen Memorial High School

Education in McAllen, Texas
1980 establishments in Texas
McAllen Independent School District high schools